Hsu Taung is a 2022 Burmese comedy television series. It aired on MRTV-4, from March 22 to April 19, 2022, on Mondays to Fridays at 19:00 for 21 episodes.

Synopsis
It is a comedy series based on the traditions of the village.

Cast
Wai Yan Lin as Hla Swe
Phone Shein Khant as Ko Kyi
So Pyay Myint as Maung Lone
Kaung Sit Thway as Maung Phone
Hsaung Wutyee May as Sandar Kyaw
Nant Chit Nadi Zaw as Thandar Kyaw
Han Na Lar as Ma Pauk Sa
Zu Zu Zan as Aye Mya Sandar
Hsu Sandi Yoon as Mi Swar
Moe Ma Kha May as Me Kha
Sharr as Ingyin
Saw Min Yar as Nagapyan Maung Thaing
Min Thu as U Kyaw Ye Yint
Gawzila as U Kyauk Doe
Nyaung Nyaung 
Nga Pyaw Kyaw
Min Zay as Lu Aye
Phyo Yazar Naing as Gun seller leader
Eaint Kyi Phyu as Salad Seller
La Won Thit as Patient's sister

References

Burmese television series
MRTV (TV network) original programming